The 2010 Concurso Internacional de Tenis – San Sebastián was a professional tennis tournament played on outdoor red clay courts. It was the third edition of the tournament which is part of the 2010 ATP Challenger Tour. It took place in San Sebastián, Spain between 16 and 22 August 2010.

ATP entrants

Seeds

 Rankings are as of August 9, 2010.

Other entrants
The following players received wildcards into the singles main draw:
  Pablo Carreño-Busta
  Juan Lizariturry
  Javier Martí
  Andoni Vivanco-Guzmán

The following players received entry from the qualifying draw:
  Baptiste Dupuy
  Marc Fornell-Mestres
  Gianluca Naso
  Pedro Sousa

Champions

Singles

 Albert Ramos-Viñolas def.  Benoît Paire, 6–4, 6–2

Doubles

 Rubén Ramírez Hidalgo /  Santiago Ventura def.  Brian Battistone /  Andreas Siljeström, 6–4, 7–6(3)

External links
Official website (es)
ITF Search